The LXXXVI Army Corps was an army corps of the German Wehrmacht during World War II. It was formed in 1942 and existed until 1945.

History 
The LXXXVI Army Corps was formed on 19 November 1942 under the supervision of Oberbefehlshaber West (Army Group D). The corps was initially headquartered at Dax in southwestern France. The initial commander of the LXXXVI Army Corps was Bruno Bieler. The corps was put under the supervision of the 1st Army in December 1942.

After the Normandy landings of 6 June 1944, the LXXXVI Army Corps was called away from the defensive position in the southwest to help the defense of Normandy. The corps was assigned to the 5th Panzer Army under Army Group B. Subsequently, it was driven back by the Allied advance to the Lille area, where it served under the 15th Army in September. The LXXXVI Army Corps was successively driven back to the Venlo and the Lower Rhine regions, where it served under the 1st Parachute Army and again under the 5th Panzer Army.

The corps fought between December 1944 and May 1945 as part of the 1st Parachute Army under Army Group H in Northwest Germany. Its final commander before German surrender was Erich Straube.

Structure

Noteworthy individuals 

 Bruno Bieler, corps commander of LXXXVI Army Corps (16 November 1942 – 1 April 1943).
 Erwin Jaenecke, corps commander of LXXXVI Army Corps (1 April 1943 – 3 June 1943).
 Gustav Fehn, corps commander of LXXXVI Army Corps (1 July 1943 – 25 August 1943).
 Hans von Obstfelder, corps commander of LXXXVI Army Corps (25 August 1943 – 30 November 1944).
 Carl Püchler, corps commander of LXXXVI Army Corps (30 November 1944 – 15 December 1944).
 Erich Straube, corps commander of LXXXVI Army Corps (15 December 1944 – May 1945).

Notes

References 

Corps of Germany in World War II
Military units and formations established in 1942
Military units and formations disestablished in 1945